Dlawarpur also spelled Dilawarpur is a village of Tehsil Kharian, Gujrat District, Punjab, Pakistan. It is a union council of Kharian tehsil Kharian and is 6 miles (11 km) from Kotla Arab Ali Khan, going east on the Kotla-Jalalpur Sobtian (Nikka Jalalpur) road.

External links
Dilawarpur ka Dumm
Dilawarpur and Neighbouring Villages

Populated places in Gujrat District